Gustav Policella (born 14 September 1975) is a German football coach and former player. He also holds Italian citizenship.

References

External links
 

1975 births
Living people
People from Neustadt an der Weinstraße
German footballers
Association football forwards
German football managers
SV Waldhof Mannheim players
SV Eintracht Trier 05 players
1. FSV Mainz 05 players
VfB Lübeck players
Rot-Weiß Oberhausen players
MSV Duisburg players
SpVgg Greuther Fürth players
Kickers Offenbach players
Fortuna Düsseldorf players
Wuppertaler SV players
KFC Uerdingen 05 players
2. Bundesliga players
German sportspeople of Italian descent
Footballers from Rhineland-Palatinate